Frederick R. De Funiak was an officer in the Confederate States Army during the American Civil War. Later he became a successful railroad engineer and an official of the Louisville and Nashville Railroad. DeFuniak Springs, Florida is named for him.

Biography
De Funiak was born in Rome, Italy, on August 5, 1839, and came to America in 1862. He enlisted in the Confederate Army as captain in the engineering department and later was promoted to lieutenant-colonel. After the war ended in 1865 he became resident engineer for the Memphis and Charleston Railroad, and in 1869 was appointed chief engineer of the Ripley Railroad. In 1870, the Memphis & Charleston, the Mississippi Central Railroad, and the East Tennessee, Virginia and Georgia Railway roads sent Colonel De Funiak abroad to study European railroad construction methods, and when he returned a year later, he accepted the position of superintendent of machinery with the Louisville & Nashville. Later he was, for a number of years, general manager of that railroad. He retired in 1884. De Funiak died at his residence in Louisville, Kentucky, on March 29, 1905 at age 65.

References

19th-century American railroad executives
Confederate States Army officers
1839 births
1905 deaths
Italian emigrants to the United States
Military personnel from Louisville, Kentucky